There is a body of films that include a character with diabetes as part of the plot. In the late twentieth century, most films' references to diabetes were minor. Characters with diabetes were developed in plots in which the disease "played a more significant role" in films such as Steel Magnolias and Panic Room. Dr. Kevin L. Ferguson discussed such films in the Journal of Medical Humanities and reported, "Films that represent diabetes must work around the disease's banal invisibility, and images of diabetics in film are especially susceptible to metaphor and exaggeration." Everyday Health reported, "Sometimes, filmmakers get it wrong: mixing up different types of diabetes, imagining symptoms or complications that aren't accurate, or unfairly portraying another aspect of the condition."

List of films

References

Bibliography

External links
Type 1: Diabetes in the Movies at Diabetes Health

Diabetes
Diabetes, list of films featuring
Films featuring diabetes, list of